Brendan Carroll (died 14 June 2007) was an Irish professional football player in the League of Ireland.

He played for Bray Wanderers from 1944 before moving to Bohemians briefly on his way to a successful career at Shelbourne whom he joined in 1947. He was top scorer for Shelbourne in seasons 1947/48 and 1948/49 and was also twice picked for his national team. 
 
Carroll made two appearances for the Republic of Ireland national football team. He made his international debut on 24 April 1949 in a 2–0 defeat to Belgium at Dalymount Park.

References

Republic of Ireland association footballers
Republic of Ireland international footballers
Ireland (FAI) international footballers
League of Ireland XI players
Bohemian F.C. players
League of Ireland players
Shelbourne F.C. players
Bray Wanderers F.C. players
2007 deaths
Year of birth missing
Transport F.C. players
Association football forwards